Charleroi-Thuin is a parliamentary constituency in Belgium used to elect members of the Parliament of Wallonia from  2019. It corresponds to the arrondissements of Charleroi and Thuin. It was created from the former constituencies of Charleroi and Thuin and was first contested for the 2019 Belgian regional elections.

Representatives

References

Constituencies of the Parliament of Wallonia